CIVA Charter High School, whose acronym stands for Character, Integrity, Vision, and the Arts, is a public charter school in  Colorado Springs, Colorado, United States. It is authorized by Colorado Springs District 11.

References

External links
Official site

High schools in Colorado Springs, Colorado
Charter schools in Colorado
Public high schools in Colorado